Tillandsia jucunda is a species in the genus Tillandsia. This species is native to Argentina and Bolivia.

Cultivars
 Tillandsia 'Blue Rinse'
 Tillandsia 'Cooran'
 Tillandsia 'Do-Ra-Me'

References

BSI Cultivar Registry Retrieved 11 October 2009

jucunda
Flora of Bolivia